Polyptychus trisecta is a moth of the family Sphingidae. It is known from lowland forests from Liberia and Ghana to the Congo and western Uganda.

The length of the forewings is 42–45 mm.

References

Polyptychus
Moths described in 1901
Moths of Africa